The 2017–18 season had Barnsley playing in the Championship The season covered the period from 1 July 2017 to 30 June 2018. Barnsley made an announcement on their official Twitter account on 3 August 2017 that Angus MacDonald is the first-team captain, and Adam Davies is the first team  vice-captain.

On 31 August 2017, Barnsley released a statement to announce that the club's chairman Maurice Watkins CBE was leaving the role as chairman and the board of Barnsley Football Club.

On 19 December 2017, it was announced that Patrick Cyrne and family had agreed of new shareholders and co-owners of Barnsley Football Club to a consortium led by Chien Lee of NewCity Capital and Pacific Media Group, which is led by Paul Conway and Grace Hung. Billy Beane and Neerav Parekh will also be investing in Barnsley Football Club with Chien Lee and Pacific Media Group. Chien Lee has 80% shares and the Cyrne family has 20% shares of ownership of Barnsley Football club.

On 6 February 2018, Barnsley F.C made an announcement that Head Coach Paul Heckingbottom, had left the club for new manager role at fellow Championship club Leeds United. Heckingbottom was joined by his first team coach, Jamie Clapham; Head of Sports Science, Nathan Winder; and First Team Performance Analyst Alex Bailey, will also leave Oakwell for Leeds. Barnsley also announced that Paul Harsley took the role as caretaker manager.
 José Morais was appointed as new head coach on 16 February 2018 on an 18-month contract.

Squad

Appearances and goals correct as of 8 May 2018.

Contracts

Statistics

|-
|colspan=14|Players out on loan:

|-
|colspan=14|Players who left the club:

|}

Goals record

Disciplinary record

Pre-season

Friendlies
As of 9 June 2017, Barnsley have announced six pre-season friendlies against Guiseley, Grimsby Town, Coventry City, Rochdale, Rotherham United and Huddersfield Town.

Competitions

EFL Championship

League table

Result summary

Results by matchday

Matches
On 21 June 2017, the EFL Championship league fixtures were announced.

FA Cup

In the FA Cup, Barnsley entered the competition in the third round and were drawn away to Millwall.

EFL Cup

On 16 June 2017, the draw for the first round took place, with Morecambe being confirmed as the opposition. The second round also saw Barnsley at home to either Grimsby Town or Derby County. Derby County won their first round tie to set up a second round fixture against the Reds.

Transfers

Transfers in

Transfers out

Loans in

Loans out

Summary

References

Barnsley F.C. seasons
Barnsley